The Dublin City School District, also known as Dublin City Schools, is a public school district in Ohio. It encompasses , and serves most of the city of Dublin, Ohio, as well as part of the city of Columbus, and unincorporated parts of Delaware and Union Counties.

In the fall of 2022, district enrollment exceeded 16,000 students  attending its nineteen schools. In the 2010-2011 school year, Dublin City Schools finished on May 27, 2011, prior to Memorial Day, however the end of the first semester did not end prior to Winter Break.

Curriculum

The curriculum and student  handbooks of the three high schools in the Dublin City School District were revised in 2007 to conform with the International Baccalaureate degree program. These changes included recognizing all students with a GPA of 4.1 or above to receive a valedictorian status, a shift from a seven period day to an eight period day, and a change from year long 1.0 credit courses to semester 0.5 credit courses. Students now receive 0.5 credits for each semester, instead of 1.0 credits at the end of the year.

Demographics

A ReMax real estate agent named Akiko Miyamoto stated in Car Talk that the services provided for Japanese speakers by the school district attract Japanese expatriates to Dublin. The district offers Japanese interpreters who send e-mails written in  Japanese, provide interpretation services at school events, and translate documents.

In 2007, Wyandot Elementary School had 568 students, including 94 Asian students, with most of them being  Japanese. To serve English as a second language students, Wyandot has collection of 150 books in Japanese, Korean, Spanish, and French in its library, including works by Japanese authors and translations of American children's books. Many Japanese and Korean families donate foreign language books to the library.

Schools

Elementary schools
 Albert Chapman Elementary School
 Daniel Wright Elementary School
 Hopewell Elementary School 
 Eli Pinney Elementary School
 Glacier Ridge Elementary School
 Griffith Thomas Elementary School
 Indian Run Elementary School
 Mary Emma Bailey Elementary School
 Olde Sawmill Elementary School
 Riverside Elementary School
 Scottish Corners Elementary School
 Wyandot Elementary School
 Deer Run Elementary School 
 Abraham Depp Elementary School

Middle schools
 Ann Simpson Davis Middle School
 John Sells Middle School
 Willard Grizzell Middle School
 Henry Karrer Middle School
 Eversole Run Middle School

High schools
 Dublin Coffman High School
 Dublin Jerome High School
 Dublin Scioto High School

Awards
 Dublin Jerome High School received a 2010 Blue Ribbon School award from the United States Department of Education.
 Willard Grizzell Middle School received  a 2009 Blue Ribbon School award from the United States Department of Education.
 All 3 high schools were identified among America's Best High Schools 2011, a ranking of the top 300 national high schools by Newsweek.
 Wyandot Elementary School received a 2017 Blue Ribbon School award from the United States Department of Education.

References

School districts in Ohio
Education in Franklin County, Ohio
Education in Delaware County, Ohio
Education in Union County, Ohio
Dublin, Ohio